Mei Lan (meaning: "American Orchid" or "Beautiful Orchid") is a male giant panda. He was born at Zoo Atlanta in Atlanta, Georgia on September 6, 2006, after his mother's, Lun Lun, record-setting 35-hour labor.  Originally identified by zoo staffers as female, Mei Lan was determined to be male by staff in China at the Chengdu Research Base of Panda Breeding. He is the first offspring of Lun Lun and Yang Yang, who are also the parents of Xi Lan, Po, and two pairs of twins, namely Mei Lun and Mei Huan, and Ya Lun and Xi Lun. Mei Lan was relocated to Chengdu, China on February 4, 2010.

Naming

Mei Lan was named at a naming ceremony held on December 15, 2006, following the Chinese tradition of naming panda cubs when they are about 100 days old. He received person of the year from Atlanta's The Sunday Paper on December 24, 2006.  In so doing, he defeated Atlanta humans Michael Vick, Cynthia McKinney, Dallas Austin, Sonny Perdue, and Bernard Marcus.

Mei Lan, which transliterates as "American Orchid" or "Beautiful Orchid", was submitted by WSB-TV, the Atlanta ABC affiliate. The name was chosen from a public online poll on ajc.com after it won 22% of the votes. Many of the names in the poll contain the words "beautiful", "orchid", "peach" or "moon" that are often given to girls in China, because Mei Lan was originally identified as female.

Repatriation
Mei Lan, like other zoo-born giant pandas in the U.S., contractually belongs to China.  He left for China on February 4, 2010, on the same flight as Tai Shan from the National Zoo in Washington D.C. His new home is at the Chengdu Panda Base, where both his parents were born.

References

External links
 Zoo Atlanta official site

Individual giant pandas
2006 animal births
Individual animals in China
Individual animals in the United States